

Heahbeorht or Heahberht was a medieval Bishop of Worcester. He was consecrated in 822. He died between 845 and 848.

Citations

References

External links
 

Bishops of Worcester
9th-century English bishops
840s deaths
Year of birth unknown